Woodville Township is one of thirteen townships in Greene County, Illinois, USA.  As of the 2010 census, its population was 239 and it contained 128 housing units.

Geography

Unincorporated towns
 Clark at 
 East Hardin at 
 King at 
 Titus at 
(This list is based on USGS data and may include former settlements.)

Cemeteries
The township contains these eleven cemeteries: Borlin, Busch, Clark, Cumming, Dayton, Fry, Maberry, Mills, Mount Gilead, Reynolds and Varble.

Major highways
  Illinois Route 16
  Woody Road

Rivers
 Illinois River

Demographics

School districts
 Calhoun Community Unit School District 40
 Carrollton Community Unit School District 1

Political districts
 Illinois' 17th congressional district
 State House District 97
 State Senate District 49

References
 
 United States Census Bureau 2007 TIGER/Line Shapefiles
 United States National Atlas

External links
 City-Data.com
 Illinois State Archives

Townships in Greene County, Illinois
Townships in Illinois